Elmer I. Thomas (1863–1895) was an American architect who practiced in Auburn and Lewiston, Maine.

Biography
Elmer Thomas was born in Lewiston in 1863 to Sylvanus D. and Julia Thomas. He attended the public schools before entering Amherst College, where he remained for only two or three years. After a period at the Massachusetts Institute of Technology, he entered the office of noted Lewiston architect George M. Coombs, remaining with him until the end of the decade. After gaining a position of high responsibility, he departed from the office in 1889. He operated an office in Auburn until December 1893, when he relocated to Lewiston, reestablishing his office in the new Osgood Building. He died on Christmas Day in 1895, at the age of 33. Early the following year his chief assistant, William R. Miller, began operating the office under his own name.

Despite his brief career, Thomas became one of Maine's most sought-after architects within a few years of beginning his practice. He was also the state's first architect to have a college education. At least two of his works have been individually listed on the  National Register of Historic Places, and several more contribute to listed historic districts.

Architectural work

 1888 - Mechanics Savings Bank Building, 79 Main St, Auburn, Maine
 George M. Coombs, architect of record
 1889 - George D. Armstrong House, 27 Frye St, Lewiston, Maine
 1890 - Enoch Lowell House, 402 Main St, Saco, Maine
 1891 - Brunswick High School (Hawthorne School), 46 Federal St, Brunswick, Maine
 Substantially rebuilt after a 1915 fire.
 1891 - Sylvanus D. Thomas Duplex, 185 Main St, Auburn, Maine
 Occupied in part by the architect
 1892 - Atkinson Building, 220 Lisbon St, Lewiston, Maine
 1892 - Byron Armstrong House, 29 Frye St, Lewiston, Maine
 1892 - Bethel M. E. Church, 75 Main St, Bethel, Maine
 1892 - Fairfield Block, 148 Main St, Biddeford, Maine
 1892 - McLain School, 40 Lincoln St, Rockland, Maine
 1893 - Opera House Block, 29 Elm St, Camden, Maine
 1894 - John H. Chase House, 16 Elm St, Auburn, Maine
 1894 - Roger Williams Hall, Bates College, Lewiston, Maine
 1895 - Hall Cottage, Good Will Home and School, Hinckley, Maine
 1895 - E. Mont Perry House, 70 Beech Street, Rockland Maine 
 1895 - Weston Avenue School, head of Middle St, Madison, Maine
 Demolished in 2014

References

1863 births
1895 deaths
Architects from Maine
People from Lewiston, Maine
19th-century American architects
People from Auburn, Maine